The 1986–87 Thorn EMI Rugby Union County Championship was the 87th edition of England's County Championship rugby union club competition.

Yorkshire won their 11th title after defeating Middlesex in the final.

Semi finals

Final

See also
 English rugby union system
 Rugby union in England

References

Rugby Union County Championship
County Championship (rugby union) seasons